The Beritashvili Institute of Physiology of the Georgian Academy of Sciences, located in Tbilisi, Georgia, is one of the leading Georgian research institutes specializing in the fields of neurobiology, atomic force microscopy, molecular biology, biochemistry, and physiology. It was founded in 1935 by Soviet physiologist Ivan Beritashvili.

External links
Official website
Georgian Academy of Sciences

Education in Georgia (country)
Science and technology in Georgia (country)
Medical and health organizations based in Russia
Universities and institutes established in the Soviet Union
Medical research institutes in the Soviet Union